Nahr Umr Field is an oil field, located north of Basrah, Iraq. Nahr Umr Field is proven to hold 6.6 billion barrels of recoverable reserve. The oil field was discovered in 1948 by the Basrah Petroleum Company, an associate of the Iraq Petroleum Company.

See also

Basrah

References

Oil fields of Iraq